Mike Clemons is an American former college football coach. He served as the head football coach at his alma mater, California State University, Sacramento, from 1993 to 1994, compiling a record of 9–11. He played at Sacramento State from 1964 to 1967 and was inducted into the school's Hall of Fame in 1981.

Clemons is the son of former National Football League (NFL) player and Sacramento State coach Ray Clemons.

Head coaching record

References

Year of birth missing (living people)
Living people
American football fullbacks
American football linebackers
Sacramento State Hornets football coaches
Sacramento State Hornets football players